77 Rue Chalgrin is a 1931 mystery film directed by Albert de Courville and starring Jean Murat,  Léon Bary and Suzy Pierson. It was made as the French-language version of the British film 77 Park Lane, based on a 1928 play by Walter C. Hackett. It was shot at Walton Studios near London.

Cast
 Jean Murat as Le baron de Cléves  
 Léon Bary as Morland  
 Suzy Pierson as Suzanne de Vandières  
  as Lucette 
 Victor Vina as Paul  
  as Sinclair  
 Pierre Nay as Carrington  
  as Philippe  
 Robert Cuperly as Donovan  
 Max Lerel as George Malton  
  as Le commissaire

References

Bibliography 
 Bock, Hans-Michael & Bergfelder, Tim. The Concise Cinegraph: Encyclopaedia of German Cinema. Berghahn Books, 2009.

External links 
 

1931 films
1931 mystery films
British mystery films
1930s French-language films
Films directed by Albert de Courville
British films based on plays
Films shot at Nettlefold Studios
British multilingual films
British black-and-white films
1931 multilingual films
1930s British films